This is a list of awards and nominations received by The Matrix franchise. The Matrix is a 1999 science fiction action film. It spawned three sequels, two of them filmed and released in the same year, The Matrix Reloaded and The Matrix Revolutions. A third sequel, The Matrix Resurrections, is set for release on December 22, 2021. The first three films were written and directed by The Wachowskis and starred Keanu Reeves, Laurence Fishburne, Carrie-Anne Moss and Hugo Weaving. The fourth film was written by Lana Wachowski, David Mitchell and Aleksandar Hemon, was directed by Lana Wachowski and starred Reeves and Moss.

The Matrix (1999)

The Matrix Reloaded (2003)

The Matrix Revolutions (2003)

The Matrix Resurrections (2021)

References

External links

 
 
 
 

Lists of accolades by film series
Accolades